Ámbito Financiero is an Argentine newspaper founded on December 9, 1976 by economist Julio A. Ramos. It is one of the main economic newspapers. It was initially sold in Downtown Buenos Aires, covering mainly the daily prices of the U.S. dollar, gold, stocks, etc., and included other editorials. 

The newspaper became successful, making it a reliable source of reference to investors and operators of the city. Ámbito Financiero was acquired by Orlando Vignatti in 2008. One of its most read columnists is Pablo Tigani.

References

External links
  Ámbito Financiero

1976 establishments in Argentina
Argentine news websites
Daily newspapers published in Argentina
Mass media in Buenos Aires
Publications established in 1976
Spanish-language newspapers